King Tuff is the second full-length album released on May 29, 2012, by the Vermont-based artist King Tuff, and his first release on the US label Sub Pop.

Track listing

References

External links
Album on Sub Pop
Artist on Sub Pop

2012 albums
Sub Pop albums
King Tuff albums